Abdul Wahid bin Ahmad, also known as Wahid Satay, A. Wahid or lesser known as S.M. Wahid (born 1930), is a Singaporean-Malaysian actor, comedian and singer.

Early life 
Wahid was born in Indragiri, Riau, Sumatra, Indonesia and migrated to Singapore in 1935. He received his early education at the Geylang Malay School.

Prior to his acting career, he took painting, which is his hobby since his school days. Because of the quality of his paintings, Wahid was offered a job as a studio set painter at the Cathay Keris Studios at East Coast Road at the end of 1956. In 1957, director B.N. Rao needed a young comedian to be given a role in the film Pontianak. Rao noted that Wahid always telling jokes to his co-workers and always making everyone on the set laughed, and thus decided to include him in Pontianak as a comedic role.

The role given to Wahid is the part of a satay seller (hence the stage name 'Wahid Satay', given by Cathay Keris Studios owner Loke Wan Tho) in a village where the people are afraid of Pontianak. Wahid so effectively acted the part of the satay seller that the scene became one of the most memorable scene of the film Pontianak. The movie Pontianak created its own history when it broke Malay movie theatre records, with a total takings of more than one million dollars, the highest amount then in 1957.

Career 
Following his huge success in Pontianak, Wahid Satay was promoted from assistant painter to full-time actor with a three-year contract. Wahid was not only competent in the field of acting, but also singing. Besides his skills in front of the camera, Wahid also performs live shows to promote his films. Up to this day, Wahid still get many invitations to perform live on stage. During his Cathay Keris Studio days, Wahid represented his studios at the Asia Pacific Film Festivals in Tokyo, Manila and Hong Kong.

As an actor with Cathay Keris Studios, Wahid starred in numerous lead and supporting actor comic parts, which led him to be labelled "the Jerry Lewis of Singapore and Malaya".

Apart from his iconic comedic role in 50 and 60s era, He also rose to fame with another comedic actor, Mat Sentul in the same period. Thus both of them had involved together in numerous comedy films of those era such as Pak Pandir Moden, 2 kali 5, etc.

Filmography

Film

References

External links
 

1930 births
Living people
Indonesian people of Malay descent
Malaysian people of Malay descent
Malaysian Muslims
Singaporean people of Malay descent
Singaporean Muslims
Malaysian male film actors
Singaporean male actors
Indonesian emigrants to Singapore